Mazzotti is a surname. Notable people with the surname include:

Adriano Sauro Lorenzo Mazzotti (born 1966), director of South African company Carnilinx (Pty) Ltd.
José Antonio Mazzotti, Peruvian poet, scholar, and literary activist
Lisa Mazzotti (born 1965), Italian voice actor
Pascal Mazzotti (1923–2002), French actor

See also
Mazzotti Reaction, a symptom complex seen in tropical medicine